Appadurai Muttulingam (Tamil அ. முத்துலிங்கம்) (born 19 January 1937) is a Sri Lankan Tamil author and essayist.  His short stories in Tamil have received critical acclaim
and won awards in both India and Sri Lanka.

Biography 

Muttulingam was born in the village of Kokkuvil in Jaffna, Sri Lanka to Appadurai and Rasamma.  He was the fifth child in a family of seven.  He obtained an undergraduate degree in the sciences from the University of Ceylon, Colombo in 1959.  He began writing short stories in the 1960s, with his short story Akka winning a competition conducted by a Sri Lankan Tamil newspaper in 1961.  This story was the title story in his first collection of short stories, Akka ("Sister"), published in 1964.

After this early success, Muttulingam did not publish any stories for the next twenty years.  He qualified as a chartered accountant in 1965.  He left Sri Lanka in 1972, and spent the next eighteen years working in various countries in Africa and Asia, including assignments with the World Bank and the United Nations.  He began writing again in 1995, and in the next three years published three collections, all of which were critically acclaimed.  The first of these was Thikatasakkaram ("Ten beautiful arms", a reference to the opening verse of the Kanthapuranam, a mediaeval Tamil work), a collection of stories drawn from his youth in Sri Lanka and his time abroad, which won the Lily Devasigamani Award in Tamil Nadu.  His next collection, Vamsaviruththi ("Family traits"), came in 1996, and won the Government of Tamil Nadu prize as well as the State Bank of India Prize.  Vatakku vithi ("The north road"), the third collection published after his return to writing, won the Cultural Prize of the Government of Sri Lanka.  He has since published another collection of short stories, a collection of essays, and has edited a volume of Tamil translations of contemporary North American writing.

Muttulingam currently lives in Toronto, Ontario, Canada, with his wife Kamalaranjini.  He is actively involved in The Tamil Literary Garden, a Toronto-based charitable organization dedicated to the international promotion of Tamil literature.

Muttulingam's stories are noted for their understatement, reserve and imagery, and focus on moments of small transformation.  His stories do not attempt to directly build suspense or dramatic tension, and are instead grounded in realism, particularly in description and characterisation.

Works 

 Akka ("Elder sister") (1964) - short stories.
 Thikatasakkaram ("Ten beautiful arms") (1995) – short stories
 Vamsaviruththi ("Family traits") (1996) – short stories
 Vadakku veethi ("The north road") (1998) – short stories
 Maharajavin rail vandi ("The king's train") (2001) – short stories
 A.Muttulingam kathaikal ("Stories of A. Muttulingam") (2004) - collected stories
 Ange ippa enna neram ("What time is it there?") (2005) – essays
 Inauspicious times (translated from Tamil into English by Padma Narayanan) (2008) - short stories
 Viyathalum Ilame(2006) - Interviews
 Kadikaram Amaithiyaaka Ennikkondirukkirathu (2006) - a collection of essays
 Poomiyin Paathivayathu("worlds half age") (2007) - essays
 Unmaikalantha Naatkurippukal (2008) - Novel
 A.Muttulingam kathaikal (2008) - audiobook
 Amerikkakari (2009) - short stories
 Amerikka Ulavaali (2010) - essays
 Onrukkum Uthavathavan(2011) - essays
 Kuthiraikkaaran(2012) - short stories
Kolunthodu Pidipaen(2013)- short stories

References

External links 
 Thikatasakkaram ("Ten beautiful arms") (1995), Tamil etext
 Vamsaviruththi ("Family traits") (1996) Tamil etext
 Vadakku veethi ("The north road") (1998) Tamil etext
 Maharajavin rail vandi ("The king's train") (2001) – Tamil etext (pdf)
 A.Muttulingam kathaikal ("Stories of A. Muttulingam") (2004) Tamil etext (pdf)
 Ange ippa enna neram ("What time is it there?") (2005) Tamil etext (pdf)
 "Writer Muttulingam's Home Page" 
 "Thaamarai Pooththa Thadaakam" 
 "paathukaapillatha mozhi" 
 Tamil Literary Garden awards a ‘labour of love’ 

Tamil-language writers
1937 births
Living people
Sri Lankan Tamil accountants
Sri Lankan Tamil writers
Alumni of the University of Ceylon (Colombo)